The National Half Century Exposition and Lincoln Jubilee, was a festival from August 22 to September 16, 1915 held in Chicago, Illinois, United States. It celebrated the 50th anniversary of the emancipation of enslaved African Americans. Held at the Chicago Coliseum near Bronzeville the exhibition was also known as the National Half Century Anniversary Exposition and The Lincoln Jubilee: 50th Anniversary Celebration.

History 
The Emancipation Proclamation was issued by United States president Abraham Lincoln on January 1, 1863. A gathering was held in Chicago in 1911 and an event celebrating the 50th anniversary of emancipation was proposed. It was originally planned for 1913 as the "Illinois (National) Half-Century Anniversary of Negro Freedom".

Atlas Printing Co. published the official program. The Fraternal Press in Chicago published a history and report on the event including the history of its establishment and photos of organizers that is available online. The event's photographer, John H. Ballard, published a photo album covering the event in 1915. It includes a leaf of music at its back titled "Praise God we are not weary" with words by Tom Brown, music by Tom Lemonier, and arranged by J. Wm. Coleman. The album is viewable online.

The Association for the Study of Negro Life and History was established by a group of prominent attendees who met during the event. Four months later member Carter G. Woodson published the first issue of the Journal of Negro History.

Chicago businessman Anthony Overton participated and promoted his skin care products at the event. He launched his Half-Century Magazine  the following year.

The Library of Congress has a collection of Chicago Daily News photographs that includes images of the event.

Gallery

See also
 American Negro Exposition, the diamond jubilee of Emancipation

References

Slavery in the United States
African-American festivals
1915 festivals
1915 in Illinois
African-American history between emancipation and the civil rights movement
American Civil War anniversaries
African-American history in Chicago